Ek Raat is a Bollywood film. It was released in 1942.

Cast
 Prithviraj Kapoor
 K.N. Singh
 Purisrar Neena
 Miss Gulab
 Mubarak
 Feroza
 Parkash
 Suleman

References

External links
 

1942 films
1940s Hindi-language films
Indian drama films
1942 drama films
Indian black-and-white films
Hindi-language drama films